Colymbetes striatus is a species of beetle native to the Palearctic, including Europe. In Europe, it is only found in Belarus, Belgium, Bosnia and Herzegovina, Croatia, the Czech Republic, mainland Denmark, Estonia, Finland, mainland France, Germany, Hungary, Kaliningrad, Latvia, Lithuania, mainland Norway, Poland, Russia, Slovakia, Slovenia, Sweden, and Ukraine.

External links
Colymbetes striatus at Fauna Europaea

Dytiscidae
Beetles described in 1758
Taxa named by Carl Linnaeus